Nadas may refer to:
 The Nadas, an American band

Places 

 Nadas Colombian Rainbow Empanadas, Latin Food Brand, based in New York City

People 
 Ödön Nádas (1891–1951), Hungarian football trainer
 Péter Nádas (born 1942), Hungarian writer
 Tamás Nádas (1969–2014), Hungarian acrobatics pilot

Places 
 Nadăș, Arad, a village in Tauț Commune, Arad County, Romania
 Nadăș, Timiș, a village in the town of Recaș, Timiș County, Romania
 Nadăș (Cigher), a tributary of the Cigher in Arad County, Romania
 Nadăș, a tributary of the Dalnic in Covasna County, Romania
 Nadăș, a tributary of the Mureș in Arad County, Romania
 Nadăș, a tributary of the Rica in Covasna County, Romania
 Nadăș (Someș), a tributary of the Someșul Mic in Cluj County, Romania
 Nadas River, an ephemeral river ending in the Namib desert

 Nádaš, Trnava, former name of a village in the Trnava District, Slovakia
 Nadas, Kıbrıscık, a village in Bolu Province, Turkey

See also 
 Nada (disambiguation)